This is a list of events in Scottish television from 2002.

Events

January
23 January – At a meeting of the Scottish Affairs Committee in Westminster, BBC governor Robert Smith, Baron Smith of Kelvin tells the committee that the possibility of a Six O'Clock News bulletin for Scotland will be considered again following next year's Scottish Parliament election.

February
4 February – MPs investigating broadcasting in Scotland visit Glasgow to hear evidence from academics and members of the Scottish Parliament.
11 February – On the same day that the BBC launches its two channels for children, CBeebies Alba is launched as the new programming slot for Children's Gaelic Programmes on BBC One Scotland at 2:55pm – 3:25pm every weekday .

March
14 March – 50th anniversary of BBC One Scotland.

April
 No events.

May
No events.

June
CBeebies Alba stops being broadcast on BBC One Scotland.

July
No events.

August
No events.

September
2 September – The preschool series Balamory is first broadcast on BBC.
24 September 
Debut of Scottish soap River City.
Border Television is rebranded as ITV Border.

October
No events.

November
 The BBC's children's programming in Gaelic resume on BBC Two Scotland during CBeebies under the same name CBeebies .

December
No events.

Debuts

BBC
26 April – Jeopardy on BBC One (2002–2004)
1 September – Still Game (2002–2007; 2016–2019)
2 September – Balamory (2002–2005)
24 September – River City on BBC One (2002–present)
7 October  – Bits and Bobs on BBC Two (2002–2003)
Unknown – Snoddy (2002)

Television series
Scotsport (1957–2008)
Reporting Scotland (1968–1983; 1984–present)
Scotland Today (1972–2009)
Sportscene (1975–present)
The Beechgrove Garden (1978–present)
Grampian Today (1980–2009)
High Road (1980–2003)
Taggart (1983–2010)
Crossfire (1984–2004)
Win, Lose or Draw (1990–2004)
Only an Excuse? (1993–2020)
Monarch of the Glen (2000–2005)

Ending this year
22 February – Chewin' the Fat (1999–2002)
12 December – Harry and the Wrinklies (1999–2002)

Deaths
29 August – Alan MacNaughtan, 82, actor
October – William Dysart, 72, actor

See also
2002 in Scotland

References

 
Television in Scotland by year
2000s in Scottish television